The Men's 200 Backstroke event at the 10th FINA World Aquatics Championships swam July 24–25, 2003 in Barcelona, Spain. Preliminary and Semifinal heats were on 24 July with the heats being held in the morning session and the semifinals being held in the evening session. The Final swam on 25 July.

At the start of the event, the existing World (WR) and Championship (CR) records were:
WR: 1:55.15 swum by Aaron Peirsol (USA) on March 22, 2002 in Minneapolis, USA
CR: 1:57.13 swum by Aaron Peirsol (USA) on July 27, 2001 in Fukuoka, Japan

Results

Final

Semifinals

Swim-off for 8th
 Blaz Medvesk (Slovenia) -- 1:58.61—q
 Gregor Tait (Great Britain) -- 1:58.80

Preliminaries

References

Swimming at the 2003 World Aquatics Championships